Ali Hazami (born 25 February 1996) is an Iranian footballer who played as a left midfielder for Baadraan in the Azadegan League.

Club career statistics 
Last updated: 17 May 2016

International career

U17
He represented Iran U17 in 2012 AFC U-16 Championship and 2013 FIFA U-17 World Cup.

U20
He invited to Iran U20 by Ali Dousti Mehr to prepare for the 2014 AFC U-19 Championship. Hazami played 3 matches for Iran during the 2014 AFC U-19 Championship.

References

Sepahan S.C. footballers
1996 births
Living people
People from Khorramshahr
Association football midfielders
Iranian footballers
Sportspeople from Khuzestan province